Saint Martin Island may refer to:

 Saint Martin (island), an island in the northeast Caribbean
 St. Martin Island, an island in Michigan
 St. Martin's Island, an island of Bangladesh  in the Bay of Bengal
 St Martin's, Isles of Scilly

See also
 Saint Martin (disambiguation)
 Martin Island (disambiguation)